Zonovo is a rural locality (a village) in Dubrovskoye Rural Settlement, Yelovsky District, Perm Krai, Russia. The population was 26 as of 2010. There are 3  streets.

Geography 
Zonovo is located 34 km southwest of Yelovo (the district's administrative centre) by road. Dubrovo is the nearest rural locality.

References 

Rural localities in Yelovsky District